The Awaroa River is a short river in the Far North District of New Zealand. Its estuary forms one of the two arms of Whangape Harbour (the other being the estuary of the Rotokakahi River).

The New Zealand Ministry for Culture and Heritage gives a translation of "long river" for Awaroa.

See also
List of rivers of New Zealand

References

Far North District
Rivers of the Northland Region
Rivers of New Zealand